KTH may refer to:
 Keat Hong LRT station, Singapore, LRT station abbreviation
 Kent House railway station, London, National Rail station code
 KTH Royal Institute of Technology, a university in Sweden
 KTH Krynica, a Polish ice hockey team
 Khyber Teaching Hospital, a university hospital in Pakistan
 .kth, the extension of KDE theme files